The 1986 NAIA Division II football season, as part of the 1986 college football season in the United States and the 31st season of college football sponsored by the NAIA, was the 17th season of play of the NAIA's lower division for football.

The season was played from August to November 1986 and culminated in the 1986 NAIA Division II Football National Championship, played at Maxwell Field on the campus of Linfield College in McMinnville, Oregon. 

Linfield defeated Baker in the championship game, 17–0, to win their third NAIA national title.

Conference standings

Conference champions

Postseason

See also
 1986 NCAA Division I-A football season
 1986 NCAA Division I-AA football season
 1986 NCAA Division II football season
 1986 NCAA Division III football season

References

 
NAIA Football National Championship